Tristagma is a genus of South American plants in the onion subfamily with the Amaryllis family. It is native to South America (Peru, Argentina, Chile and Uruguay) but one of the species (T. uniflorum) has become naturalized in various other places.

Species

 Tristagma ameghinoi (Speg.) Speg. - Mendoza + Santa Cruz Provinces of Argentina
 Tristagma anemophilum Ravenna - Neuquén Province of Argentina
 Tristagma atreucoense Ravenna - Neuquén Province of Argentina
 Tristagma bivalve (Hook. ex Lindl.) Traub - central Chile
 Tristagma brevipes (Kuntze) Traub - central Chile
 Tristagma circinatum (Sandwith) Traub - Neuquén Province of Argentina
 Tristagma fragrans Ravenna - central Chile
 Tristagma gracile (Phil.) Traub - central Chile
 Tristagma graminifolium (Phil.) Ravenna - central Chile
 Tristagma leichtlinii (Baker) Traub - central Chile
 Tristagma lineatum Ravenna - Santiago Region of Chile
 Tristagma lomarum Ravenna - Arequipa Region of Peru
 Tristagma malalhuense Ravenna - Mendoza Province of Argentina
 Tristagma mirabile Ravenna - Neuquén Province of Argentina
 Tristagma nahuelhuapinum Ravenna - Rio Negro Province of Argentina
 Tristagma nivale Poepp. - central + southern Chile, southern Argentina
 Tristagma patagonicum (Baker) Traub - southern Argentina
 Tristagma peregrinans Ravenna - Uruguay
 Tristagma philippii Gand. - central Chile
 Tristagma poeppigianum (Gay) Traub - central Chile
 Tristagma porrifolium (Poepp.) Traub - central Chile
 Tristagma sessile (Phil.) Traub - Chaco Province of Argentina, central Chile, Uruguay
 Tristagma sociale Ravenna - Mendoza Province of Argentina
 Tristagma staminosum Ravenna  - O'Higgins Region of Chile
 Tristagma tweedieanum (Baker) Traub - Uruguay, northeastern Argentina
 Tristagma uniflorum (Lindl.) Traub - Uruguay, eastern Argentina; naturalized in Great Britain, France, Australia, New Zealand, Oregon, California, southeastern United States (from Texas to Maryland)
 Tristagma yauriense Ravenna - Puno Province of Peru

formerly included
Several names have been coined using the name Tristagma  but referring to species now considered better suited other genera (Beauverdia, Leucocoryne, and Nothoscordum).

References

Bibliography 

 

Amaryllidaceae genera
Taxa named by Eduard Friedrich Poeppig